Kanaranzi may refer to:

Kanaranzi, Minnesota
Kanaranzi Township, Rock County, Minnesota
Kanaranzi Creek